Saint Andrews is an unincorporated community in Douglas County, in the U.S. state of Washington.

History
A post office called Saint Andrews was established in 1890, and remained in operation until 1957. James Saint Andrews, an early postmaster, gave the community his name. It exists as a ghost town, one with dilapidated buildings and artifacts.

References

Unincorporated communities in Douglas County, Washington
Unincorporated communities in Washington (state)